The Central Texas Council of Governments (CTCOG) is a voluntary association of cities, counties and special districts in Central Texas.

Based in Belton, the Central Texas Council of Governments is a member of the Texas Association of Regional Councils.

Counties served
Bell
Coryell
Hamilton
Lampasas
Milam
Mills
San Saba

Largest cities in the region (Census 2010 Population)
Killeen (127,921)
Temple (66,102)
Copperas Cove (32,032)
Harker Heights (26,700)
Belton (18,216)
Gatesville (15,751)
Lampasas (6,681)
Rockdale (5,595)
Cameron (5,552)
Nolanville (4,259)

Military community
Fort Hood is located in Bell and Coryell Counties and is the largest employer in the CTCOG region. The U.S. Census recognizes Fort Hood as a Census-Designated Place; in 2010 the Fort Hood CDP had 29,589 residents.

References

External links
Central Texas Council of Governments - Official site.

Texas Association of Regional Councils